Citadel Communications Ltd. is an American private broadcasting company. It is based in Bronxville, New York and owns 1 low-power television station on which it operates a regional 24-hour cable news channel. The company was founded in 1982 by former National Association of Broadcasters joint board chairman and current Broadcasters Foundation of America chairman Phil Lombardo.

Upon completion of the Digital TV transition in 2009, Citadel's stations at that time returned their digital broadcasts to their former analog channel assignments in the VHF spectrum. As a result of poor propagation characteristics for digital TV in the VHF bands, these stations now operate low-power digital fill-in translators in the UHF band to improve coverage in their communities of license. See the digital TV section on the WHBF-TV entry for further information on the Citadel stations' post-transition digital signals.

In February 2009, Phil Lombardo became an investing partner in LDB Media, LLC., owners of the Suncoast News Network, a regional cable news channel in Sarasota, Florida. In January 2014, Lombardo and Citadel purchased a majority interest in the company. As a result, Citadel took over broadcast operations of SNN and integrated the channel with its other stations.

On September 16, 2013, Citadel announced that it would sell WOI-DT, KCAU-TV, and WHBF-TV to the Nexstar Broadcasting Group for $88 million. Nexstar immediately took over the stations' operations through a time brokerage agreement. The deal followed Phil Lombardo's decision to "slow down," as well as a desire by Lynch Entertainment to divest its investments in WOI and WHBF. Citadel would continue to own KLKN, WLNE-TV, and its Sarasota properties. On March 5, 2014, the Federal Communications Commission approved the sale of these stations to Nexstar outright and the deal was completed on March 13.

On May 16, 2019, it was announced that Standard Media, led by former Young Broadcasting and Media General executive Deb McDermott, would acquire Citadel's WLNE and KLKN for $83 million. The sale was completed on September 5.

Stations

Current Citadel property

1 Low-power; Sarasota is part of the Tampa/St. Petersburg television market. Also 24-hour regional cable news channel. Citadel purchased a majority interest in station owner LDB Media, LLC in 2014.

Former Citadel-owned stations

References

External links

SNN Website

Television broadcasting companies of the United States
Companies based in Westchester County, New York
Companies established in 1982
1982 establishments in New York (state)